Bonhams and Butterfield was a large American auction house, founded in 1865 by William Butterfield in San Francisco. 

It was purchased in 1999 from Bernard Osher by online auctioneer eBay for $260 million.

In 2002, it was acquired from eBay by British auctioneer Bonhams and operated under the name Bonhams & Butterfields for about ten years.  It now just goes by Bonhams.

References

External links

EBay
American auction houses
American companies established in 1865
Retail companies established in 1865
1999 mergers and acquisitions
2002 mergers and acquisitions